Diazald (N-methyl-N-nitroso-p-toluenesulfonamide) is used as a relatively safe and easily handled precursor to diazomethane, which is toxic and unstable. Diazald has become the favored commercially available precursor for the synthesis of diazomethane, compared to reagents like N-methyl-N-nitrosourea and N-methyl-N'-nitro-N-nitrosoguanidine, which are less thermally stable and more toxic and mutagenic, respectively.

Upon the addition of a base such as sodium hydroxide or potassium hydroxide and mild heating (65–70 °C) in a mixture of water, diethyl ether, and a high boiling polar cosolvent (e.g., diethylene glycol monomethyl ether), the N-nitrososulfonamide undergoes successive elimination reactions to produce diazomethane (which is codistilled as an ethereal solution) as well as a p-toluenesulfonate salt as a byproduct, according to the following mechanism:
Like other nitroso compounds, it is thermally sensitive, as a result of its weak N–NO bond whose bond dissociation energy was measured to be 33.4 kcal/mol.

References

Sulfonamides
Nitroso compounds
Alkyl-substituted benzenes